Matveyevo is a rural locality (a village) in Pyatovskoye Rural Settlement, Totemsky District, Vologda Oblast, Russia. The population was 241 as of 2002. There are 5 streets.

Geography 
Matveyevo is located 14 km northeast of Totma (the district's administrative centre) by road. Kormakino is the nearest rural locality.

References 

Rural localities in Totemsky District